Live at Redlands University is a double live album by American jazz musician Stan Kenton and his orchestra, released in late 1970 by Creative World Records.  It was the initial release on Kenton's newly formed record company after he broke his relationship with Capitol Records. Recording for the album took place in Southern California at Redlands University in August of 1970. 

The album's influence on future large ensemble jazz composition and arranging has led critiques to acknowledge it as an influential album of the later Kenton orchestras and of the 1970s. The album is a class production, and musically a success to interpret the Kenton style in contemporary terms in a live setting.

Background
Up to the time of Live At Redlands University the band had released recordings with Capitol.  The 1969 Capitol release of Stan Kenton: the music of 'HAIR' was the last Kenton LP with that label and was moving in a direction beyond away from which the Kenton 'brand name' had been built on since 1943.  He had no involvement in the Hair LP except for Kenton's name placed on the jacket cover; Ralph Carmichael and Lennie Niehaus were placed in charge of the project. Capitol producer Lee Gillette was trying to exploit the money making possibilities of the popular 1968 musical featuring contemporary rock music.   Due to lack of promotion by Capitol, the LP was a financial failure; this would be the last release for Kenton under he aegis of Capitol.  

The transition from Capitol to Creative World Records in 1970 was fraught with difficulties during a time when the music business was changing rapidly. As a viable jazz artist who was trying to keep a loyal but dwindling following, Kenton turned to arrangers such as Hank Levy and Bob Curnow to write material that appealed to a younger audience.  The first release for the Creative World label were live concerts and Kenton had the control he wanted over content but lacked substantial resources to engineer, mix, and promote what Capitol underwrote in the past. Kenton would take a big gamble to bypass the current record industry and rely far more on the direct mail lists of jazz fans which the newly formed Creative World label would need to sell records.

Live At Redlands University was recorded live with no inter-cutting or over-dubbing throughout the entire two LP set. Sound engineer Wally Heider was used for the album as he was renowned in Los Angeles for live recording and revolutionized with live 24 track recording during that time.  The album was mixed a mastered at United Western Recorders by Andy Richardson.

Reception and influence

Live at Redlands University was released in 1970 on Creative World Records in the United States, in double LP format with a double cover.  It has been duly reviewed as a class production as the first of Kenton's Creative World releases.  The double LP is an artistic highlight for both Stan Kenton and Creative World Records, it's a live album that breaks ground for the Kenton organization to have greater say in the future direction of the group.

Track listing

Personnel

Musicians
piano and leader: Stan Kenton
saxophones and flutes: Quin Davis, Richard Torres, Norm Smith, Willie Maiden, Jim Timlin
trumpets: Mike Vax, Jim Kartchner, Dennis Noday, Warren Gale, Joe Ellis
trombones: Dick Shearer, Mike Jamieson, Fred Carter, Tom Bridges (bass trombone)
tuba: Graham Ellis
acoustic and electric bass: Gary Todd
drum set: John von Ohlen
percussion: Effrain Lobgreira

Production
Dick Shearer – production
Wally Heider – recording engineering
Doug Neal – liner notes
Andy Richardson – mix engineer

References

Bibliography

External links

 Live at Redlands University at Allmusic
 Live at Redlands University at All Things Kenton

Live instrumental albums

1970 live albums
Stan Kenton albums
GNP Crescendo Records albums
University of Redlands
Albums produced by Dick Shearer